Justice Faizanuddin is a former judge of the Supreme Court of India.

Born in 1932 in Panna, Madhya Pradesh, he graduated from Hamidia College of Bhopal. He was appointed a judge of Madhya Pradesh High Court in 1978, and a judge of the Supreme Court of India in 1993. He retired from the Supreme Court in 1997, and was appointed as the Lokayukta (Ombudsman) for the State of Madhya Pradesh. He retired from the Lokayukta office in 2003. He died on 27 October 2019.

His family currently resides in Bhopal.

External links
Biography of Faizanuddin

Living people
1932 births
Judges of the Madhya Pradesh High Court
20th-century Indian Muslims
People from Bhopal
People from Panna, India
Ombudsmen in India
Justices of the Supreme Court of India
20th-century Indian judges